Frederick Gough may refer to:
 Frederick Gough (MP for Horsham) (1901–1977), British Territorial Army officer, company director and politician
 Frederick Gough, 4th Baron Calthorpe (1790–1868), British peer and MP for Hindon, and for Bramber 
 Frederick Foster Gough (c. 1825–1889), Protestant Christian missionary

See also
 Frederick Gough School, a community secondary school in Scunthorpe, England